Badway Green is a piece of common land in the parish of Church Broughton in Derbyshire, England.

References

Geography of Derbyshire
South Derbyshire District